Bald Mountain is a  peak in the western Uinta Mountain Range in the Uinta-Wasatch-Cache National Forest on the border between Summit and Wasatch counties in northeastern Utah, United States.

Description
Utah State Route 150 (SR‑150) passes just east of the mountain.

Bald Mountain Trail
The summit can be reached by the Bald Mountain Trail (National Forest Trail 3202), beginning at Bald Mountain Pass on SR‑150,. The trail provides views of the surrounding areas. The hike to the summit can be completed in 2 to 3 hours round trip. The trail does commonly have snow.

See also

 List of mountains in Utah

References

External links

 
 
 
 

Mountains of Utah
Features of the Uinta Mountains
Mountains of Duchesne County, Utah
Mountains of Summit County, Utah
Wasatch-Cache National Forest